Notoraja is a genus of skates in the family Arhynchobatidae. They are found in deep water in the Indian and western Pacific Ocean.

Species
There are currently 13 recognized species in this genus:
 Notoraja alisae Séret & Last, 2012 (Alis skate)
 Notoraja azurea McEachran & Last, 2008 (Blue skate)
 Notoraja fijiensis Séret & Last, 2012 (Fiji skate)
 Notoraja hirticauda Last & McEachran, 2006 (Ghost skate)
 Notoraja inusitata Séret & Last, 2012 (Strange skate)
 Notoraja lira McEachran & Last, 2008 (Broken Ridge skate)
 Notoraja longiventralis Séret & Last, 2012 (Long-ventral skate)
 Notoraja martinezi Concha, Ebert & Long, 2016 (Barbedwire-tailed skate)
 Notoraja ochroderma McEachran & Last, 1994 (Pale skate)
 Notoraja sapphira Séret & Last, 2009 (Sapphire skate)
 Notoraja sereti White, Last & Mana, 2017 (Papuan velvet skate)
 Notoraja sticta McEachran & Last, 2008 (Blotched skate)
 Notoraja tobitukai (Hiyama, 1940) (Lead-hued skate)

References

Rajiformes
Ray genera